23S rRNA (guanosine2251-2'-O)-methyltransferase (rlmB (gene), yifH (gene)) is an enzyme with systematic name S-adenosyl-L-methionine:23S rRNA (guanosine2251-2'-O-)-methyltransferase. This enzyme catalyses the following chemical reaction

 S-adenosyl-L-methionine + guanosine2251 in 23S rRNA  S-adenosyl-L-homocysteine + 2'-O-methylguanosine2251 in 23S rRNA

The enzyme catalyses the methylation of guanosine2251.

References

External links 
 

EC 2.1.1